Protobothrops sieversorum, commonly known as the three horned-scaled pitviper or the three-horn-scaled pit-viper, is a species of venomous snake, a pit viper in the family Viperidae. The species is endemic to Vietnam.

Taxonomy
Protobothrops sieversorum was originally placed in the monotypic genus Triceratolepidophis. Guo et al. (2007) synonymised this genus with the genus Protobothrops, based on evidence that it is phylogenetically nested within the existing species of that genus.

Etymology
The specific name, sieversorum (masculine, genitive, plural), is in honor of the Sievers family, father Dr. J.-H. Sievers and sons Julian Sievers and Moritz Sievers, for their support of nature conservation and zoological research.

Geographic range
P. sieversorum is indigenous to Quang Binh Province, Vietnam.

Habitat

Reproduction
P. sieversorum is oviparous.

References

Further reading
Gumprecht A, Tillack F, Orlov NL, Captain A, Ryabov S (2004). Asian Pitvipers. Berlin: GeitjeBooks. 368 pp. . (Triceratolepidophis sieversorum).
Hermann H-W, Ziegler T, Stuart BL, Orlov NL (2002). "New findings on the distribution, morphology and natural history of Triceratolepidophis sieverorum (Serpentes: Viperidae)". Herpetological Natural History 9 (1): 89–94.
Ziegler T, Herrmann H-W, David P, Orlov N, Pauwels OSG (2000). "Triceratolepidophis sieversorum, a New Genus and Species of Pitviper (Reptilia: Serpentes: Viperidae: Crotalinae) from Vietnam". Russian Journal of Herpetology 7 (3): 199–214.
Ziegler T, Herrmann H-W (2002). "Wiederentdeckung zweier gehörnter grubenotterarten in Vietnam ". Mitteilungen Zoologische Gesellschaft für Arten- und Populationsschutz 18 (2): 24–26. (in German).

Reptiles of Laos
Reptiles of Vietnam
Protobothrops

Snakes of Vietnam
Snakes of Asia